Kevin Boyle (born May 30, 1992) is an American former professional ice hockey goaltender. Boyle played in the National Hockey League (NHL) for the Anaheim Ducks.

Playing career

Amateur
Boyle first played competitive hockey as a junior with the New Jersey Rockets of the Atlantic Junior Hockey League from 2007 through 2010, he made one appearance with the Tri-City Storm of the United States Hockey League (USHL) during his tenure with the Rockets.

Moving to the British Columbia Hockey League (BCHL) as an 18-year old for the 2010–11 season, Boyle appeared in 39 games for the Westside Warriors, earning All-Rookie Team honours.

Boyle originally committed to play collegiate hockey at the University of Massachusetts Amherst of the Hockey East. He played both his freshman and sophomore seasons with the Minutemen posting a 16-17-6 record in 41 games before he was cut by head coach John Micheletto prior to his junior season. He was forced to sit out the 2013–14 season to transfer to rival program the University of Massachusetts Lowell.

Boyle returned to resume his collegiate career with the Riverhawks, enjoying a standout senior season in 2015–16 with Lowell, recording a 24-10-5 record, 1.88 (GAA), .934 (SV%) and seven shutouts to earn Hockey East Goaltender of the Year and Hockey East Co-Player of the Year, alongside Thatcher Demko. He ranked tied for fourth in the nation in GAA, fifth in wins, tied for sixth in SV%, tied for third in shutouts and starts (39), as Boyle established a single-season school record in shutouts and broke former NHL Goaltender Dwayne Roloson's school record for minutes played (2,342 in 1993-94). He was the first player in Hockey East history to win conference Player of the Year honors as a Second-Team All-Conference selection.

Professional
Undrafted, Boyle gained NHL interest from his collegiate success, resulting in agreeing to a one-year, entry-level contract with the Anaheim Ducks on March 31, 2016.

In his first professional season in 2016–17, Boyle began the year with the Ducks secondary affiliate, the Utah Grizzlies of the ECHL, posting a 9–6–1 record in 16 games before he was elevated to remain with the San Diego Gulls of the AHL, going 10–5–4 with one shutout. On June 30, 2017, Boyle was re-signed to a one-year contract extension to continue with the Ducks.

Boyle continued his progression in the 2017–18 season, playing the full season with the Gulls of the AHL. In collecting a 29–18–6 record with two shutouts, Boyle ranked 10th among AHL goaltenders in SV% (.921), while finishing second among rookies in SV%, fifth in wins (19) and sixth in GAA (2.66). Boyle established a San Diego Gulls franchise record last season in games played with 35 and matched a club record for single-season wins.

On June 19, 2018, Boyle signed a two-year, two-way contract extension with the Ducks. During the 2018–19 season, Boyle received his first recall to the NHL on November 19, 2018, however returned to the Gulls without playing. With the slumping Ducks suffering injuries to established duo Ryan Miller and John Gibson, Boyle was recalled to serve as backup to Chad Johnson. On February 9, 2019, Boyle made his NHL debut with the Ducks, coming in relief of Johnson after the first period. In 40 minutes, he stopped 19 of 21 shots in a 6–2 defeat to the Philadelphia Flyers. On February 13, Boyle made his first career NHL start where he stopped 35 shots from the Vancouver Canucks for his first career shutout.

On October 9, 2020, Boyle signed a one-year, two-way contract with the Detroit Red Wings. In his lone season within the Red Wings' organization, he was assigned to their AHL affiliate, the Grand Rapids Griffins. In 12 appearances in the pandemic shortened 2020–21 season, he posted a 7–3–1 record.

On August 20, 2021, Boyle signed his first European contract by agreeing to a one-year deal with Italian based HC Bolzano of the ICE Hockey League.

On August 5, 2022, Boyle announced his retirement from professional hockey through Instagram.

Career statistics

Awards and honors

References

External links
 

1992 births
Living people
Anaheim Ducks players
Grand Rapids Griffins players
San Diego Gulls (AHL) players
Tri-City Storm players
UMass Lowell River Hawks men's ice hockey players
UMass Minutemen ice hockey players
Undrafted National Hockey League players
Utah Grizzlies (ECHL) players
People from Manalapan Township, New Jersey
Sportspeople from Monmouth County, New Jersey
American men's ice hockey goaltenders
Ice hockey players from New Jersey